is a Japanese actor and voice actor.

Filmography

Television animation
Ristorante Paradiso (2009) – Gian Luigi Orsini (Gigi)
Mobile Suit Gundam AGE (2011) – Dian Fonroid, Zafar Rogue and others
Tiger & Bunny (2011) – Walter
Battle Spirits: Saikyou Ginga Ultimate Zero (2014) – Hansoro
One Piece (2019) - Toyama Tsujigiro

Original video animation
Mobile Suit Gundam: The Origin (2015) – Ramba Ral

Theatrical animation
Broken Blade (2011) – Kurozawa

Tokusatsu
Jyuken Sentai Gekiranger (2007) – Mythical Beast Cetus-Fist Gouyu (ep. 37, 45)
Fire Leon (2013) – Other Bio Wrestler (eps. 1 - 11, 13 - 16, 21 - 22)

Video games
Fire Emblem Fates (2015) – Benoît
Dragon Quest Heroes II (2016)
Soulcalibur V (2012) – Maxi
Soulcalibur VI (2018) – Maxi

Television dramas
Liar Game (2009) – Solario (voice)

Dubbing

Live-action
The Avengers – Thomas Roberts
Dollhouse – Paul Ballard (Tahmoh Penikett)
Don't Look Up – Dr. Teddy Oglethorpe (Rob Morgan)
Gulliver's Travels – Lilliputian Royal Guard (Harry Peacock)
The Mentalist – Agent Kimball Cho (Tim Kang)
Running Wild with Bear Grylls – Zachary Quinto
Star Trek – Spock (Zachary Quinto)
Star Trek Into Darkness – Spock (Zachary Quinto)
Star Trek Beyond – Spock (Zachary Quinto)
The Tudors – William Compton (Kris Holden-Ried)

Animation
Love, Death & Robots – Coulthard

References

External links
 Official profile 
 

1973 births
Japanese male video game actors
Japanese male voice actors
Living people
Male voice actors from Osaka Prefecture
21st-century Japanese male actors
Tokyo Actor's Consumer's Cooperative Society voice actors